Monterey Bay League (MBL) was a high school athletic conference part of the CIF Central Coast Section of the California Interscholastic Federation.  It comprised high schools generally around Monterey County, California, with schools from southern Santa Clara County, Watsonville on the edge of Santa Cruz County and one of only two high schools in San Benito County.  Not all schools participated in all sports. In 2017, Monterey Bay League merged with the Mission Trail Athletic League (MTAL) to create the Pacific Coast Athletic League (PCAL).

Historical Members
 Alisal High School
 Everett Alvarez High School
 Aptos High School	
 Christopher High School
 Gilroy High School
 Live Oak High School
 Monte Vista Christian High School	
 Monterey High School
 North Monterey County High School
 North Salinas High School	
 Notre Dame High School
 Pajaro Valley High School
 Palma High School	
 Salinas High School
 San Benito High School	 
 Seaside High School
 Watsonville High School

References

CIF Central Coast Section